The temple de l'Amour (English: Temple of Love) is a garden folly of the Château de Versailles, and more specifically, in the Petit Trianon part of it.

Bibliography 
 

 

 

 

 

 

Folly buildings in France
Palace of Versailles